The African Journal for Physical, Health Education, Recreation and Dance is a quarterly peer-reviewed academic journal. It covers physical education, health education, and dance in Africa (including sports). It is published by LAM Publications (Nigeria) and hosted by African Journals OnLine.

External links 
 

Education journals
Quarterly journals
Publications established in 1995
English-language journals
Health education journals
African studies journals